Richard Charles Carson (June 4, 1929 – December 19, 2021) was an American television director. He was a five-time Emmy Award winner, having directed shows including The Tonight Show, Wheel of Fortune, and The Merv Griffin Show. He moved to Norfolk, Nebraska, in 1934 with his family, and graduated from Norfolk High School in 1947. Carson later attended the University of Nebraska–Lincoln and joined the United States Navy, where he became an officer. In 1952, Carson was stationed in San Diego, California as an ensign. He was the younger brother of comedian and television talk show host Johnny Carson.

On December 19, 2021, Carson died after a brief illness in Studio City, Los Angeles, at the age of 92.

References

External links

2015 interview by the Directors Guild of America

1929 births
2021 deaths
American television directors
People from Clarinda, Iowa
University of Nebraska–Lincoln alumni
United States Navy officers
People from Norfolk, Nebraska
Military personnel from Iowa